Mohamed Hossam El Nagar (born 12 January 2000), known as Mido Hossam, is an Egyptian professional footballer who plays as a defender for El Dakhleya on loan from Al Ahly.

Club career
Hossam started his career with local side Port Fouad, before joining Egyptian giants Al Ahly in 2011. He was named on the bench once for Al Ahly, in an Egyptian Premier League game against ENPPI, but did not feature. After ten years in Cairo, Hossam was loaned out to Czech side Viktoria Žižkov in August 2021.

After three months, in which he played five games in the Czech National Football League, and two in the Czech Cup, Hossam was recalled by Al Ahly, and sent on loan again, this time to Czech First League side Teplice.

Career statistics

Club

Notes

References

2000 births
Living people
Egyptian footballers
Egypt youth international footballers
Association football defenders
Czech National Football League players
Bohemian Football League players
Al Ahly SC players
FK Viktoria Žižkov players
FK Teplice players
Egyptian expatriate footballers
Egyptian expatriate sportspeople in the Czech Republic
Expatriate footballers in the Czech Republic